The European road E391 or E391 is a European road running from Trosna in Russia to Hlukhiv in Ukraine.

General 
The European road 391 is a Class B connection road and connect the Russian city Trosna with the Ukrainian city Hlukhiv which makes it at a distance of approximately 160 kilometers. The route has been recorded by the UNECE as follows: Trosna - Hlukhiv.

Route 
 
 : Hlukhiv (E101) - Russian border 
 
: Ukrainian border - Kalinovka (E101)
: Kalinovka - Trosna

External links 
 UN Economic Commission for Europe: Overall Map of E-road Network (2007)

391
European routes in Ukraine
E391